Caye Caulker (Spanish: Cayo Caulker) is a small limestone coral island off the coast of Belize in the Caribbean Sea measuring about  (north to south) by less than  (east to west). The town on the island is known by the name Caye Caulker Village. The population of Caye Caulker is approximately 2,000 people today and still growing.

In recent years, the island has become a popular destination for backpackers and other tourists. There are over 50 hotels and a number of restaurants and shops.

Geography
The island is made up of a sand bar over a limestone shelf. An underwater cave named Giant Cave is found below the Caye in the limestone. This reef is known as a dry reef with the reef exposed at the surface, while further north the reef is a deep reef and lies under  of water. The area is popular with windsurfers.

A narrow waterway known as the Split divides the island in two. Some people state that the Split was created by Hurricane Hattie in 1961 which devastated Belize City; however, this is largely untrue. Villagers who actually hand dredged it maintain that it is largely a man-made feature. The Village Council Chairman at the time, Ramon Reyes, recounts that he and others dredged the waterway by hand after Hurricane Hattie opened a passage a few inches deep. This made a practical water way between the west and east sides of the island, intended at first for dugout canoes. The natural erosion of the soft sand banks of the waterway continues to this day and threatens to further widen the passage.

History

Settlement

Caye Caulker is thought to have been inhabited for hundreds of years; however, the recent population levels did not start until the Caste War of Yucatan in 1847, when many mestizos of mixed Maya and Spanish descent fled the massacres taking place across the Yucatán.

The area of the village was granted to Luciano Reyes by Queen Victoria around 1870. Lots were sold to six or seven families, most of which still have descendants on the island today. The influence of these families is still very apparent.

The location of the main settlement on the island is thought to have remained unchanged for hundreds of years. The bay at the back of the village provides shelter for boats while the reef at the front provides good protection from large waves. The coral sand near the village provides adequate anchorage compared to the soft mud found elsewhere on the island.

Hurricane Hattie
When Hurricane Hattie struck the island in 1961, a storm surge swept across the narrow part of the village. The wooden schoolhouse, being used as a shelter at the time, was destroyed by waves, killing 13, mostly children. The eye of the storm passed to the south of the island, sparing it from further destruction.

The village council was supported in the task of rebuilding by Governor Thornley's Emergency Committee and formed teams to do various types of work. About 42 houses were built in a few weeks. The British Army also helped, with helicopters bringing medical and food supplies. Caye Caulker remains vulnerable to direct hits from hurricanes because it has no defenses from storm surges.

In modern times, there have been at least four major hurricanes which have devastated the island, the most recent of which was Hurricane Keith in 2000. Since the island is only  at its highest point, a strong storm surge can easily cover the entire island, as occurred during Hattie and Keith.

Economy
The main industry on the island prior to tourism was fishing. The island sits in the middle of natural migration routes for fish, and feeding grounds for conch and lobster. During World War II, fishermen living on the island also collected debris from torpedoed ships in the Caribbean that came floating ashore. The most lucrative were bales of rubber. The fishing industry is thought to support about 80 families on the island.

The growth of tourism on the island

Tourism first started on the island around 1964, with only a few visitors on weekends from the mainland Belleview Hotel, brought out by a local boat called 'Sailfish', built by a schoolteacher beside the then Teachers House. The early tourists were mostly people working with the Belize Government. Around 1969, Dr. Hildebrand of the University of Corpus Christi started visiting each winter with a Marine Biology Expedition of around 24 students. Backpackers also found their way to the island at this time, but transportation was only by fishing sailboats and there was no accommodation. The Auxillou family pioneered the tourism industry and the first scuba diving lessons and trips were started around the late 1960s.

As speedboats came into use in the 1970s tourists became more regular. Hippies following the so-called "Gringo Trail", of Isla Mujeres, Tulum, Caye Caulker, Tikal and Lake Atitlan in Guatemala passed through the island (many of them making use of the easily available marijuana). The reputation spread by word of mouth.

Today, the diversified economy of the village still includes lobster, fish, and tourists. Internet e-commerce is growing in a small way. Recent hurricanes had a major effect on lobster fishing as well as dramatically affecting the vegetation. The island ecology is slowly returning to that prior to the storms. The island is now becoming a center for many painters and some musicians. There are also a few up and coming lyrical artists on the island, prominent among them include Alexander Joseph, otherwise known as "Bobbo youth" and ILYA Rosado a.k.a. "ILLA-G" who have developed a local islander fan base with their rap and reggae-style music.

The small airplanes and asphalt-paved airstrip of Caye Caulker Airport may appear small to visitors accustomed to jet airliners and long concrete runways, but the system of barrier islands support a lively network of air transportation with an array of travel times. For those passengers preferring a route more commonly adopted by locals, there are regular water taxi services providing transportation to and from the island. San Pedro Express  and Ocean Ferry are currently offering service from Caye Caulker to San Pedro Town and Belize City. Regular taxi service is available from the main Belize City airport to the docks for both companies. The watercraft typically sport two to four large motors and make the journey in 30 to 50 minutes depending on weather and the size of the boat.

Once on the island, the main mode of transport is simply walking. The roads are  well defined, and crossing the island takes 20 to 40 minutes depending on road conditions. Bicycles and golf carts are also common and can be easily rented. Visitors prone to sunburn should take extra precautions, as the island is entirely white coral sand, and reflected sunlight can cause mild sunburns even in the shade. The Island is also used as a popular launch off for scuba diving the Great Blue Hole, with several expeditions per week.

References

External links

Caye Caulker Insider by locals - Official Caye Caulker Travel Guide

Caye Caulker Travel Guide
Caye Caulker Travel Information - Belize Travel Magazine

Populated places in Belize District
Belize Rural South
Islands of Belize